

The Maeda  Aircraft Corporation created the Ku-6. Maeda was designed by The Aeronautical Institute of the Imperial University in Tokyo. It is one of the notable aircraft concepts developed during World War II.

It was designed with all the requirements that the Army's Troop Transport Command needed. The main problem that the army faced was the difficulty of moving armored fighting vehicles long distances over the main islands of Japan to resist seaborne invasion. They came up with the idea that it could be done by equipping the vehicle with wings, empennage, and take-off carriages. Once landed, all the items that needed to make the vehicle airborne would be quickly detached to allow it to go into action as a ground vehicle.

In 1939, the Japanese Amy Air Force Examination Department began the development of  Special Tank No.3 Ku-Ro that was initially given the name Sora-Sha (“air vehicle”). The glider for this project was given the Army designation Ku-6, which can also be read or abbreviated as "Ku-Ro", and thus that also became the code name for the tank the glider was intended to carry. While Mitsubishi built the special tank, Maeda Kōken Kōgyō constructed the wing and empennage. Maeda completed the prototype in January 1945.

Specifications

See also
Antonov A-40, a Russian flying tank
Baynes Bat, an experimental British design

References

Ku-6, Maeda
1940s military gliders
World War II Japanese aircraft